Ich bin ein Star – Die große Dschungelshow (I'm a star - The big jungle show) is a German special show of the reality show Ich bin ein Star – Holt mich hier raus! and began airing on January 15, 2021 and ended on January 29, 2021 on RTL Television. In 15 live episodes, the first candidate for the 15th season in 2022 was determined among the participants. Also the winner would won €50.000. Filip Pavlović won the show.

Production
Due to the COVID-19 pandemic, the 15th season of the original show, was originally planned for 2021 to take place for the first time in the history of the show not in Australia, but in North Wales, at Gwrych Castle. On October 22, 2020, it was announced that production in Wales was canceled and RTL was working on a new concept. On December 1, 2020, it was announced that from January 15, 2021 a new show under the name Ich bin ein Star – Die große Dschungelshow would take place. In 15 live episodes, the first candidate for the 15th season in 2022 will be found among the participants. In addition, former campers look back on the past 14 seasons. Production takes place in the Nobeo studios in Hürth-Efferen.

Like in the original show, since 2013 Sonja Zietlow and Daniel Hartwich have been moderators, also in this show they are the moderators. The paramedic Bob McCarron alias "Dr. Bob" is also back.

Format
This year the candidates live in what is known as a Tiny-house. The first three candidates each fight for three days for two places in the semi-final show. The viewers decides who are going in the semi-final. Also in this show, the candidates have to do every day Bushtucker trials and win stars. The eight candidates of the semi-final show will then fight to entry into the final show. The winner of the show will be the first participant in the 15th season in 2022 and will receive €50,000.

Celebrities
On January 8, 2021, the twelve participants were announced. On January 11, 2021, RTL announced that drag queen Nina Queer, who had self-deprecatedly referred to as a "Hitler tranny" in the past due to racially interpreted statements about homophobic attacks, was replaced with Sam Dylan.

Results and elimination

 Indicates that the celebrity received the most votes from the public
 Indicates that the celebrity was in the bottom two of the public vote
 Indicates that the celebrity received the fewest votes and was eliminated

 Team One (Day 1-3)
 Team Two (Day 4-6)
 Team Three (Day 7-9)
 Team Four (Day 10-12)

 Team Five (Day 13)
 Team Six (Day 14)
 Finals (Day 15)

Bushtucker trials
The contestants take part in daily trials.

Notes
 This trial was the same as in the tenth season.
 This trial was the same as in the fourteenth season, but with the name "Alles kann, nichts muss" ("Everything is possible, nothing is necessary").
 This trial was the same as in the tenth and eleventh season, but with the name "Der große Preis von Murwillumbah" ("The Murwillumbah Grand Prix")
 This trial was the same as in the ninth season.
 All-or-nothing-trial: The contestants had to find 12 parts and put them together to form a star.
 This trial was the same as in the fourteenth season.

Star count

Guest
In each episode, participants from the previous 14 seasons visit the studio and look back on their own season.

Notes
 Krause was giving a speech per video message.
 Schäfer only had a brief appearance without an interview.
 Jones was not a participant in that season.
 Cordalis is the son of Costa Cordalis, the late winner of the first season. He also confirmed his participation in 2022s fifteenth season.
 In show 15 there was no review, but Glööckler was confirmed to be the second participant in the upcoming season 15.

Ratings

References

External links
 

 
German reality television series
RTL (German TV channel) original programming
2021 German television series debuts
2021 German television series endings
2020s German television series
2021 German television seasons
Television series by ITV Studios
Television shows set in Germany
German-language television shows